HMCS Fundy was a  that served in the Royal Canadian Navy from 1938 to 1945. The minesweeper was the first warship built for Canada since 1918. She saw service in the Atlantic Ocean during the Second World War. The vessel was named for the Bay of Fundy. After the war she had an extensive civilian career.

Design and description 
In 1936, new minesweepers were ordered for the Royal Canadian Navy. Based on the British , those built on the east coast would cost $318,000 per vessel. At the outbreak of the Second World War, the Royal Canadian Navy considered constructing more, but chose to build s instead upon learning of that design due to their oil-burning engines.

The Fundy class, named after the lead ship, displaced . They had a complement of 3 officers and 35 ratings.

The Fundy class was propelled by one shaft driven by vertical triple expansion engine powered by steam from a one-cylinder boiler.

The ships were armed with one QF  Mk IV gun mounted forward on a raised platform.  The minesweepers were armed with two 20 mm Oerlikon anti-aircraft cannon. They were later equipped with 25 depth charges.

Service history
Fundy was ordered on 23 August 1937 as the lead ship of her class of four minesweepers built in Canada. The ship's keel was laid down on 24 January 1938 by Collingwood Shipyards Ltd. at Collingwood, Ontario. The warship was launched on 18 June later that year. Fundy was commissioned into the Royal Canadian Navy on 1 September 1938 at Collingwood.

After commissioning, Fundy was one of two of the Fundy-class minesweepers assigned to the East Coast of Canada.  She was stationed at Halifax, Nova Scotia when the war broke out. At the onset of war, Fundy  and sister ship  were the only warships available to patrol the entrance to Halifax's harbour. Fundy saw continuous service in the Second World War as a minesweeper and harbour defence vessel for Halifax Harbour. In July 1942 she escorted a convoy to Boston and one back to Halifax. Along with her sister ship , Fundy rescued 66 survivors of the torpedoed Liberty ship SS Martin Van Buren on 15 January 1945. Fundy was decommissioned on 27 July 1945 and laid up.

Commercial service
Fundy was sold in 1947 to Marine Industries Limited and converted for mercantile service with a gross register tonnage of 419 tons. The ship was initially renamed Aigle Marin in 1967, owned by Les Chargeurs Unis Inc. The merchant vessel was sold to Niquelay Incorporated and renamed Anne R.D. in 1977. The vessel was broken up at La Malbaie, Quebec in July 1987. Her bell is preserved at the Maritime Museum of the Atlantic in Halifax.

References

Notes

Citations

Sources

External links

 "HMCS Fundy" Specifications and History, Canadian Navy Heritage website
 Canadian Navy Photo Archive HMCS Fundy 

 

Fundy-class minesweepers
Ships built in Collingwood, Ontario
1938 ships
World War II minesweepers of Canada